The women's sprint was held on 19 October 2013, with 18 riders participating.

Results

Qualifying
The fastest 12 riders advanced to the 1/8 finals.

1/8 Finals
Winners proceed directly to the quarter-finals; losers proceed to the repechage.

1/8 Finals Repechages
Winners proceed to the quarter-finals.

Quarter-finals
One-on-one matches are extended to a 'best of three' format hereon.
Winners proceed to the semi-finals; losers proceed to the race for places 5-8.

Race for 5th place
This ranking final determines the allocation of places 5-8.

Semi-finals
Winners proceed to the gold medal final; losers proceed to the bronze medal final.

Finals
Final rankings were determined in the medal races.

References

European Track Championships – Women's sprint
Women's sprint